Catherine Beattie (née McDonald) (April 5, 1921 – September 24, 2014) was an American farmer and politician.

Early life 
Beattie was born in Danville, Vermont. She went to the Danville public schools and graduated from Danville High School in 1938.

Career 
Beattie served in the Vermont House of Representatives in 1965 and 1966 and was a Democrat.

Personal life 
Beattie married Harold Beattie and was the co-owner of the McDonald Farm. Her daughters Jane Kitchel and Catherine Toll also served in the Vermont General Assembly.

She died at her home at the McDonald Farm in Danville, Vermont.

References

1921 births
2014 deaths
People from Danville, Vermont
Farmers from Vermont
Women state legislators in Vermont
Democratic Party members of the Vermont House of Representatives
21st-century American women